Alberto Ghidoni (born 15 April 1962) is an Italian alpine ski coach and former alpine skier.

Career
He competed in the 1984 Winter Olympics.

References

External links
 

1962 births
Living people
Italian male alpine skiers
Olympic alpine skiers of Italy
Alpine skiers at the 1984 Winter Olympics
Alpine skiers of Centro Sportivo Carabinieri
Italian alpine skiing coaches